The Battle of Sapong Hills was fought in Sara, Iloilo province, between the forces of Spanish colonial government and Visayan revolutionaries led by the "female General" Teresa Magbanua. The Filipino revolutionaries decisively won the battle, and in this battle where Teresa herself was considered the "Visayan Joan of Arc".

See also
Battle of Tres de Abril
Battle of Barrio Yoting

Battles of the Philippine Revolution
History of Iloilo
Conflicts in 1898